Dioxyna conflicta is a species of tephritid or fruit flies in the genus Dioxyna of the family Tephritidae.

Distribution
Philippines, Indonesia, New Guinea, New Britain, New Caledonia.

References

Tephritinae
Diptera of Asia
Diptera of Australasia
Insects described in 1929